Muschampia mohammed, the Barbary skipper, is a butterfly of the family Hesperiidae. It is endemic to Morocco and Algeria. It is found in dry and flower-rich areas between 1,500 and 2,000 meters.

The length of the forewings is 15–16 mm, although the first generation is smaller, with a forewing length of about 14 mm. Adults are on wing from March to June in two generations.

The larvae feed on Phlomis species.

References

External links
All Butterflies of Europe

Muschampia
Butterflies described in 1887
Butterflies of Africa
Taxa named by Charles Oberthür